Devere Woodrow "Chris" Christensen (November 15, 1918 – December 12, 2013) was an American water polo player who competed at the 1948 Summer Olympics in London. Born in Hamilton, Iowa and competing out of the Los Angeles Athletic Club, he was a member of the United States national team that was eliminated in the second round of that year's water polo tournament. Christensen attended the University of California, Los Angeles and was a member of the school's water polo team from 1939 through 1941, captaining the squad in 1940 and 1941. Prior to this he attended Fullerton Union High School and was a California Interscholastic Federation swimming champion in the 220 yard event. He was also a member of the LAAC squad that won the 1947 National Amateur Athletic Union Water Polo Championship. In 1983, he was inducted into the USA Water Polo Hall of Fame.

References

External links
 

1918 births
2013 deaths
American male water polo players
Olympic water polo players of the United States
People from Marion County, Iowa
Sportspeople from Iowa
UCLA Bruins men's water polo players
UCLA Bruins men's swimmers
Water polo players at the 1948 Summer Olympics